Šehić is a Bosnian surname. Notable people with the surname include:

Asim Šehić (born 1981), Bosnian footballer
Edin Šehić (born 1995), Bosnian footballer
Eldar Šehić (born 2000), Bosnian footballer
Faruk Šehić (born 1970), Bosnian poet, novelist and short story writer
Ibrahim Šehić (born 1988), Bosnian footballer

Bosnian surnames
Slavic-language surnames
Patronymic surnames